Jheol is a small town in Sanghar District, Sindh, Pakistan. It is located about 3 km from Sanghar and is on the way to Hyderabad from Sanghar.

Sanghar District
Populated places in Sanghar District